This is a list of episodes from the second season of King of the Hill, which aired on Fox from September 21, 1997 to May 17, 1998 for 23 episodes.

Production
The showrunner for the season was Greg Daniels. Wes Archer, the supervising director, did a redesign on most of the characters to make them appear more realistic than they did in the first season. In his 2003 DVD commentary for the episode "How to Fire a Rifle Without Really Trying", Daniels reflected, "in season two, because of the way animation works, there was a big overlap. The episodes from season one were coming back and requiring producing and music and editing while we were writing season two. So, during the first season we had a very pure experience of just writing them without any distractions, and in the second season it suddenly got a lot harder because you'd be trying to write, and something would come in requiring attention." Daniels added that, "this was part of the time I kept having a lot of car accidents, because we were so tired." Early in the production of the season, Pamela Adlon couldn't come in for table reads due to the birth of her first daughter. 

A July 1997 article from USA Today revealed that the upcoming season would include guest appearances from Troy Aikman, Burt Reynolds, Sally Field, Chris Rock, Green Day and Jennifer Jason Leigh. The article also mentioned that the Hill family would make a guest cameo as in-universe characters on an upcoming episode of The Simpsons (the episode, titled "Bart Star", aired on Fox in November 1997). The crossover featured the voice of Mike Judge, with Daniels explaining to USA Today that, "In the world of King of the Hill, The Simpsons exists only in that Bobby has a Bart doll. They exist as a TV show."

The Christmas episode "The Unbearable Blindness of Laying" originated from an idea that was jotted down on an index card, which sat alongside dozens of other story ideas on a conference-room wall, until executive story editor Paul Lieberstein decided to take the story further. It featured a sex scene between Hank's mother and her new boyfriend, which Daniels viewed as risque. On the night before the episode's table read, the writers spent until 5 a.m. reworking the script of this episode, changing the sex scene and the personality of the boyfriend character, as Daniels deemed him as too plain. Regarding the sex scene, Daniels remarked at the time, "we [needed] to find a way to have adults know what's going on but have kids see something else."

Broadcast history
The episodes originally aired Sundays at 8:30–9:00 p.m. (EST) on the Fox Broadcasting Company.

Episodes

Home media
The season was released on DVD by 20th Century Fox Home Entertainment. "The Company Man" was released on the Season 1 DVD due to its production code. It is presented as a season two episode on Hulu and most syndicated packages (barring Cartoon Network's Adult Swim).

References 

1997 American television seasons
1998 American television seasons
King of the Hill 02